The 27th Battalion Virginia Partisan Rangers was a cavalry regiment raised in Virginia for service in the Confederate States Army during the American Civil War. It fought mostly in East Tennessee and western Virginia.

Virginia's 27th Battalion Partisan Rangers was formed in September, 1862, with seven companies, later increased to nine. The unit served in General Hodge's and W.E. Jones' Brigade and participated in various engagements in East Tennessee and western Virginia. During April, 1864, it contained 240 effectives, and in July it merged into the 25th Virginia Cavalry Regiment. Lieutenant Colonel Henry A. Edmundson was in command.

See also

List of Virginia Civil War units

References

Units and formations of the Confederate States Army from Virginia
1862 establishments in Virginia
Military units and formations established in 1862
1865 disestablishments in Virginia
Military units and formations disestablished in 1865